Akamkpa is a Local Government Area of Cross River State, Nigeria. Its headquarters are in the town of Akamkpa.
 

The postal code of the area is 542.

References

Local Government Areas in Cross River State